Chilo leucealis is a moth in the family Crambidae. It was described by Hubert Marion in 1957. It is found in Benin.

References

Chiloini
Moths described in 1957